Cheon Myeong-kwan (The romanization preferred by the author according to LTI Korea) (born 1964)  is a South Korean novelist, screenwriter and film director. His novel Modern Family was adapted into a film, Boomerang Family, in 2013.

Life
Cheon was born in Yong-in South Korea in 1964. He debuted in 2003 with the short story “Frank and I.” Before becoming a writer, he worked for a movie production company and also wrote the screenplays for films like Gun and Gun (1995, 총잡이) and The Great Chef (1999, 북경반점). Although he wrote numerous screenplays and prepared to star in a few films himself, production on these movies was suspended. Although it was a bitter time of failure, it was no doubt an important period of his training and discipline as a writer.

Cheon turned to writing fiction in an attempt to find another means of making money, spurred on by the words of his sibling who said that he should write novels instead of writing screenplays that would never be made into movies. The result was “Frank and I,” an absurd and hilarious story about the narrator’s unemployed husband who goes to Canada to meet his cousin Frank and ends up meeting Frank, a Los Angeles gang leader. With this short story, he won the Munhakdongne New Writer Award. Only a year later in 2004, he won the 10th Munhakdongne Novel Award for his first novel Whale (고래), which spins a wry epic tale about a country girl who transforms into an entrepreneur in the city. Modern Family (고령화 가족), featuring a motley crew of family members, is narrated by a middle-aged son who has been unemployed for the past 10 years ever since his debut film flopped. With these two works, he jump-started his writing career, receiving widespread attention from critics and readers alike as a unique and invigorating presence in the Korean literary scene. My Uncle, Bruce Lee is a chronicle of an uncle as seen through his nephew’s eyes.

Works in English
 Modern Family (2015)
 Homecoming (2015)
 Whale (2023)

Works
Novels:
My Uncle, Bruce Lee (2012)
Modern Family (2010)
Whale (2004)

Short stories:
 Cheerful Maid Marisa (2006)
 "Frank and I"

Films:
 ''Hot Blooded (2022)

Awards
The 10th Munhakdongne Novel Award (2004)
Munhakdongne New Writer Award (2003)

References

1964 births
South Korean novelists
South Korean screenwriters
Living people